Pandit Pandharinathacharya Galagali (10 July 1922 — 29 August 2015) was a Sanskrit scholar, author, poet, journalist, and orator. 

He has authored over 50 books in Kannada and Sanskrit, among which are Shri Shambhu Linga Vijaya Champu (Sanskrit), Raaga Viraga (Kannada), Bharata Swaatantrya Sangramasya Itihasaha (Sanskrit), and Mahabharatada Mahileyaru (Kannada). He was also the editor of five Kannada and Sanskrit newspapers for over four decades.

He is the recipient of various awards and honours, including the Rashtrapati Award (Presidential Award of India) and Dalmia Award. He is also notable for being the first person from the state of Karnataka to win the Sahitya Akademi Award for contributions in Sanskrit.

Early life
Pandharinathacharya Galagali was born on 10 July 1922 to Kurmacharya Galagali in a village named Galagali. His formal education was stopped in the first grade, and he began his study of Vedic literature under his father Kurmacharya Galagali and uncle Ramacharya Galagali.

Adulthood
From 1944 to 1960, he worked as a Sanskrit teacher at Shankrappa Sakri High School in Bagalkot. In 1961, he moved to Gadag, where he started a Sanskrit school called Veera Narayana Pathashala.

In 1971, Acharya Galagali established the Veda Purana Sahitya Mala to translate and publish the 18 Mahapuranas into Kannada (14 have been translated into 18 volumes so far).

For over forty years, Acharya Galagali served as the editor for the following newspapers:
 Shri Sudha (Kannada)
 Madhura Vani (Sanskrit)
 Panchamrutha (Kannada)
 Vaijayanti (Sanskrit)
 Tatvavada (Kannada) - Published by Akhila Bharat Madhwa Mahamandala.

Style of writing
Pandit Galagali's predominant prose style follows that of Banabhatta while his poetic technique resembles that of Kalidasa.

"He excels in the usage of alankāras like Parisamkhyā, Ullekha, Upamā, Ílesa, Mālopamā and Anuprāsa. Galagali is a versatile author and has covered a vast spectrum of various genres in his writings. He is in fact an epitome of creativity and learning in Sanskrit, and being an excellent orator, has [revived] Sanskrit culture through his speeches also."

Publications
Over the course of a lifetime, Pandit Galagali has published 22 original Sanskrit works, 21 original Kannada works, and 23 translated works.

Original Sanskrit Works

Original Kannada Works

Translated Kannada Works

Awards and recognition
 "National Award" by Sahitya Akademi for Shambhu Linga Vijaya Champu, a masterpiece in Sanskrit Champu (a genre consisting of a combination of prose and poetry) - 1983
 Ramkrishna Dalmia's "Sri Vanee Nyaasa" award—Considered the Sanskrit equivalent of a Jnanpith Award. - 21 July 2003
 Rashtrapati Award from the first president of India, Dr. Rajendra Prasad - 1994
 Kannada Kalidasa title conferred by Samyukta Karnataka.
 Vice President of Bijapur's Sanskrit Sahitya Sammelan
 Rajya Prashasti from the state of Karnataka.
 Mahamahopadhyaya honorary degree of Sri Venkateswara University awarded by Rashtriya Samskrita Vidyapeetha of Tirupathi
 Gold medal from Shringeri and Kanchi Kamkoti Math
 Dhyana Pramoda title conferred by Shri Satyatma Tirtha of Uttaradi Math
 Raghavendra Anugraha from Raghavendra Swami Math in Mantralayam.
 Vidvatkula Tilaka by Bangalore Nagarikaru
 Vishwesha Tirtha Prashasti awarded by Pejavara Math - 2003
 Kavi Kula Tilaka title conferred by Admar Math
 Sahitya Ratna title conferred by Vibhudesha Tirtha of Admar Math
 Sachastra Pravachana Vichakshana title conferred by Palimaru Math
 Sanskriti vahaka title conferred by Dharma Sanskriti Prathisthana
 Shastra Pravachana Ratna and Purana Teertha titles conferred by Bhandarkere Swamiji
 Vidyadhi Raja title conferred by Mulubagilu Math

References

External links
 Official Listing of Sanskrit Sahitya Akademi Award Recipients from 1955-2007
 Reference to Pandharinathacharya Galagali in the Encyclopaedic Dictionary of Pali Literature
 Karnataka Culture
 Sundara Kanda Oration by Pandharinathacharya Galagali
 Bhagavatha Discourse by Pandharinathacharya Galagali
 Raghavendra Swami Discourse by Pandharinathacharya Galagali
 Ganga Lahari and Alakh Niranjan by Pandharinathacharya Galagali
 Bhamati by Pandharinathacharya Galagali
 Raga Viraga by Pandharinathacharya Galagali
 Shambhu Linga Vijaya Champu by Pandharinathacharya Galagali
 Bharatada Bramharishigalu by Pandharinathacharya Galagali
 Ramarasayanam by Pandharinathacharya Galagali
 Satyadhyanamunisha Vijayam by Pandharinathacharya Galagali
 Pavana Paavana Champu by Pandharinathacharya Galagali
 Panduranga Vittala Shatakam by Pandharinathacharya Galagali
 Kollapura Mahalakshmi Shatakam by Pandharinathacharya Galagali
 Vaijayanti Sanskrit Newspaper 4th Sanchika
 Vaijayanti Sanskrit Newspaper 5th Sanchika
 Vaijayanti Sanskrit Newspaper 7th Sanchika
 Vaijayanti Sanskrit Newspaper 8th Sanchika

Dvaita Vedanta
Sanskrit scholars
People from Hubli
1922 births
2015 deaths
Recipients of the Sahitya Akademi Award in Sanskrit